Junction City School District may refer to:

 Junction City School District (Arkansas), based in Junction City, Arkansas
 Junction City School District (California), based in Junction City, California
 Junction City School District (Oregon), based in Junction City, Oregon